First-seeded Stan Smith won the singles title at the 1972 Paris Open by defeating third-seeded Andrés Gimeno in the final 6–2, 6–2, 7–5.

Seeds
A champion seed is indicated in bold text while text in italics indicates the round in which that seed was eliminated.

  Stan Smith (champion)
  Ilie Năstase (quarterfinals)
  Andrés Gimeno (final)
 n/a

Draw

 NB: The Semifinals and Final were the best of 5 sets while all other rounds were the best of 3 sets.

Final

Section 1

Section 2

External links
 1972 Paris Open draw

Singles